"White Christmas" is an Irving Berlin song reminiscing about an old-fashioned Christmas setting. The song was written by Berlin for the 1942 musical film Holiday Inn. The composition won the Academy Award for Best Original Song at the 15th Academy Awards.

Since its release, "White Christmas" has been covered by many artists, the version sung by Bing Crosby being the world's best-selling single (in terms of sales of physical media) with estimated sales in excess of 50 million copies worldwide. When the figures for other versions of the song are added to Crosby's, sales of the song exceed 100 million.

History

Origin
Accounts vary as to when and where Berlin wrote the song. One story is that he wrote it in 1940, in warm La Quinta, California, while staying at the La Quinta Hotel, a frequent Hollywood retreat also favored by writer-director-producer Frank Capra, although the Arizona Biltmore also claims the song was written there. He often stayed up all night writing. One day he told his secretary, "I want you to take down a song I wrote over the weekend. Not only is it the best song I ever wrote, it's the best song anybody ever wrote."

Bing Crosby versions

The first public performance of the song was by Bing Crosby, on his NBC radio show The Kraft Music Hall on Christmas Day, 1941, a few weeks after the attack on Pearl Harbor. A copy of the recording from the radio program is owned by Crosby's estate and was loaned to CBS News Sunday Morning for their December 25, 2011, program. Crosby subsequently recorded the song with the John Scott Trotter Orchestra and the Ken Darby Singers at Radio Recorders for Decca Records in 18 minutes on May 29, 1942, and it was released on July 30 as part of an album of six 78-rpm discs from the musical film Holiday Inn. At first, Crosby did not see anything special about the song. He just said "I don't think we have any problems with that one, Irving."

The song established that there could be commercially successful secular Christmas songs—in this case, written by a Jewish immigrant to the United States. Ronald D. Lankford, Jr., wrote, "During the 1940s, 'White Christmas' would set the stage for a number of classic American holiday songs steeped in a misty longing for yesteryear." Before 1942, Christmas songs and films had come out sporadically, and many were popular. However, "the popular culture industry had not viewed the themes of home and hearth, centered on the Christmas holiday, as a unique market" until after the success of "White Christmas" and the film where it appeared, Holiday Inn. Dave Marsh and Steve Propes wrote, "'White Christmas' changed Christmas music forever, both by revealing the huge potential market for Christmas songs and by establishing the themes of home and nostalgia that would run through Christmas music evermore."

The song initially performed poorly and was overshadowed by Holiday Inn'''s first hit song: "Be Careful, It's My Heart". By the end of October 1942, "White Christmas" topped the Your Hit Parade chart. It remained in that position until well into the new year. It has often been noted that the mix of melancholy—"just like the ones I used to know"—with comforting images of home—"where the treetops glisten"—resonated especially strongly with listeners during World War II. The Armed Forces Network was flooded with requests for the song. The recording is noted for Crosby's whistling during the second chorus.

In 1942 alone, Crosby's recording spent eleven weeks on top of the Billboard charts. The original version also hit number one on the Harlem Hit Parade for three weeks, Crosby's first-ever appearance on the black-oriented chart. The song also topped the following weekly charts in the same year: Songs with Most Radio Plugs, National record sales, and National sheet music sales. Re-released by Decca, the single returned to the No. 1 spot during the holiday seasons of 1945 and 1946 (on the chart dated January 4, 1947), thus becoming the only single with three separate runs at the top of the U.S. charts. The recording became a chart perennial, reappearing annually on the pop chart twenty times before Billboard magazine created a distinct Christmas chart for seasonal releases.

In Holiday Inn, the composition won the Academy Award for Best Original Song in 1942. In the film, Crosby sings "White Christmas" as a duet with actress Marjorie Reynolds, though her voice was dubbed by Martha Mears. This now-familiar scene was not the moviemakers' initial plan. In the script as originally conceived, Reynolds, not Crosby, would sing the song. The song would feature in another Crosby film, the 1954 musical White Christmas, which became the highest-grossing film of 1954. (Crosby made yet another studio recording of the song, accompanied by Joseph J. Lilley's orchestra and chorus, for the film's soundtrack album.)

According to Crosby's nephew, Howard Crosby, "I once asked Uncle Bing about the most difficult thing he ever had to do during his entertainment career… He said in December, 1944, he was in a USO show with Bob Hope and the Andrews Sisters. They did an outdoor show in northern France… he had to stand there and sing 'White Christmas' with 100,000 G.I.s in tears without breaking down himself. Of course, a lot of those boys were killed in the Battle of the Bulge a few days later."

The version most often heard today on the radio during the Christmas season is the 1947 re-recording. The 1942 master was damaged due to frequent use. Crosby re-recorded the track on March 19, 1947, accompanied again by the Trotter Orchestra and the Darby Singers, with every effort made to reproduce the original recording session. The re-recording is recognizable by the addition of flutes and celesta in the beginning.

Although Crosby dismissed his role in the song's success, saying later that "a jackdaw with a cleft palate could have sung it successfully", he was associated with it for the rest of his career.

Sales figures
Crosby's "White Christmas" single has been credited with selling 50 million copies, the most by any release and therefore it is the biggest-selling single worldwide of all time. By 1968, it had already sold thirty million. The Guinness Book of World Records 2009 Edition lists the song as a 100-million seller, encompassing all versions of the song, including albums. Crosby's holiday collection Merry Christmas was first released as an LP in 1949, and has never been out of print since.

There has been confusion and debate on whether Crosby's record is the best-selling single, due to a lack of information on sales of "White Christmas," because Crosby's recording was released before the advent of the modern-day US and UK singles charts. However, after careful research, Guinness World Records in 2007 concluded that, worldwide, Crosby's recording of "White Christmas" has sold at least 50 million copies, and that Elton John's recording of "Candle in the Wind 1997" has sold 33 million. However, an update in the 2009 edition of the book decided to further help settle the controversy amicably by naming both John's and Crosby's songs to be "winners" by stating that John's recording is the "best-selling single since UK and US singles charts began in the 1950s," while maintaining that "the best-selling single of all time was released before the first pop charts," and that this distinction belongs to "White Christmas," which it says "was listed as the world's best-selling single in the first-ever Guinness Book of Records (published in 1955) and—remarkably—still retains the title more than 50 years later."

Legacy
In 1999, National Public Radio included it in the "NPR 100", which sought to compile the one hundred most important American musical works of the 20th century. Crosby's version of the song also holds the distinction of being ranked No. 2 on the "Songs of the Century" list, behind only Judy Garland's "Over the Rainbow," as voted by members of the RIAA. In 2002, the original 1942 version was one of 50 historically significant recordings chosen that year by the Library of Congress to be added to the National Recording Registry. In 2004, it ranked No. 5 on AFI's 100 Years...100 Songs survey of top tunes in American cinema.

In a UK poll in December 2012, "White Christmas" was voted fourth (behind "Fairytale of New York", "I Wish It Could Be Christmas Everyday" and "Merry Xmas Everybody") on the ITV television special The Nation's Favourite Christmas Song.

The recording was broadcast on Armed Forces Radio on April 30, 1975, as a secret, pre-arranged signal precipitating the U.S. evacuation from Saigon.

Formats and track listing
These are the formats and track listings of single releases of "White Christmas".

Original verse
Irving Berlin's opening verse is often dropped in recordings. 
It is included on A Christmas Gift for You from Phil Spector, sung by Darlene Love; on Barbra Streisand's A Christmas Album; on the Carpenters' Christmas Portrait, sung by Karen Carpenter; on Neil Diamond's The Christmas Album; on Bette Midler's Cool Yule; on Libera's Christmas Album; and on Crash Test Dummies' Jingle All the Way.

Charts
Bing Crosby version

Michael Bublé version

Glee Cast version

Gwen Stefani version

Meghan Trainor version
Weekly charts

Year-end charts

Certifications
Bing Crosby version

Michael Bublé version

 Other versions 
"White Christmas" is the most-recorded Christmas song; there have been more than 500 recorded versions of the song, in several different languages. The following have received some charting success.

Gordon Jenkins and his Orchestra (with Bob Carroll on lead vocal) released a version on Capitol Records that reached No. 16 on Billboard magazine's pop singles chart in 1942 and Charlie Spivak and his Orchestra (with Garry Stevens on lead vocal) released a version for Columbia Records that reached No. 18 on Billboards pop singles chart as did Freddy Martin and his Orchestra (with Clyde Rogers on lead vocal) for RCA Victor, reaching No. 20 on Billboards pop singles chart (and again in December 1945, reaching No. 16).

In 1944, Frank Sinatra with a backing orchestration under the direction of Axel Stordahl for Columbia, reached No. 7 on Billboards pop singles chart (two more times: December 1945, No. 5; December 1946, No. 6) Jo Stafford reaching No. 9 on Billboards pop singles chart in 1946, with backing vocals by the Lyn Murray Singers and backing orchestration by Paul Weston for Capitol. Eddy Howard and his Orchestra released a version on the Majestic label that reached No. 21 on Billboards pop singles chart the same year while Perry Como, with backing orchestration by Lloyd Shaffer, recorded the song for RCA Victor in 1947 and reached No. 23 on Billboards pop singles chart; Como recorded a stereo version of the song in 1959.

In 1949, The Ravens peaked at No. 9 on Billboards Rhythm & Blues Records chart in January 1949 on National Records. while Ernest Tubb, with female backing vocals by The Troubadettes on Decca, peaked at No. 7 on Billboards Country & Western Records chart.

In 1952, Mantovani and his orchestra reached No. 23 on Billboards pop singles chart while The Drifters showcased the talents of lead singer Clyde McPhatter and the bass vocals of Bill Pinkney in 1954, peaking at No. 2 on Billboards Rhythm & Blues Records chart. It returned to the same chart in the next two years. In February 1954, the Drifters recorded “White Christmas,” which was released that November. While the song became a No. 5 R&B hit in 1954, its popularity remained in the black community. The Drifters rendition of this song can be heard in the films Home Alone and The Santa Clause.

In 1953, Bing Crosby sang "White Christmas" in a film made in Paris as part of The Ford 50th Anniversary Show, a two-hour television special broadcast on NBC and CBS.

Andy Williams recorded the song for Columbia in 1963 on The Andy Williams Christmas Album, where it reached No. 1 on Billboards weekly Christmas Singles chart. It was released in 1968 on Atco Records as a posthumous single from Otis Redding, and reached No. 12 on the Christmas Singles chart. In 1980, Darts's version peaked at No. 48 on the UK singles chart.

Michael Bolton performed it on his 1992 non-holiday album, Timeless: The Classics, where it peaked at No. 73 on Billboards Hot 100 Airplay chart in January 1993. Garth Brooks version included on his first holiday album, Beyond the Season, peaked at No. 70 on Billboards Hot Country Singles & Tracks chart in January 1995. In 1998 Martina McBride recorded it for her album White Christmas, charting twice, reaching No. 75 on Billboards Hot Country Singles & Tracks chart in 1999, and No. 62 on the same chart in 2000

Bette Midler's version, released on her non-holiday album, Bette Midler Sings the Rosemary Clooney Songbook, reached No. 15 on Billboards Hot Adult Contemporary Tracks chart in 2003. The version released on Andrea Bocelli 2009 album, My Christmas, reached No. 16 on the Portuguese Singles Chart. Despite not being released as a single, Marco Mengoni's version, released on the compilation album X Factor – The Christmas Album, charted at No. 13 on the Italian Singles Chart based on digital downloads of the track.

The Glee cast's version of the song, sung by Darren Criss and Chris Colfer, entered the UK charts for the first time in 2018, four years after its release, at No. 98.

In 2020, a version by Meghan Trainor, featuring Seth MacFarlane, went to No. 1 on Billboard''s Adult Contemporary chart.

See also 
 List of best-selling sheet music
 List of best-selling singles

Notes and references

External links
 Library of Congress essay on Crosby's version on the National Recording Registry.

1942 songs
1942 singles
American Christmas songs
Bing Crosby songs
Best Original Song Academy Award-winning songs
Songs written by Irving Berlin
Number-one singles in the United States
1940s jazz standards
Jazz compositions in A major
Decca Records singles
MCA Records singles
Atlantic Records singles
Darlene Love songs
Michael Bublé songs
Songs about nostalgia
Songs about weather
Songs of World War II
Song recordings produced by Phil Spector
Song recordings with Wall of Sound arrangements
United States National Recording Registry recordings